In the First Folio, the plays of William Shakespeare were grouped into three categories: comedies, histories, and tragedies; and modern scholars recognize a fourth category, romance, to describe the specific types of comedy that appear in Shakespeare's later works.

Plays
This alphabetical list includes everything listed as a comedy in the First Folio of 1623, in addition to the two quarto plays (The Two Noble Kinsmen and Pericles, Prince of Tyre) which are not included in the Folio but generally recognised to be Shakespeare's own. Plays marked with an asterisk (*) are now commonly referred to as the romances. Plays marked with two asterisks (**) are sometimes referred to as the problem plays.

 All's Well That Ends Well**
 As You Like It
 The Comedy of Errors
 Love's Labour's Lost
 Measure for Measure**
 The Merchant of Venice**
 The Merry Wives of Windsor
 A Midsummer Night's Dream
 Much Ado About Nothing
 Pericles, Prince of Tyre* 
 The Taming of the Shrew
 The Tempest*
 Twelfth Night
 The Two Gentlemen of Verona
 The Two Noble Kinsmen*
 The Winter's Tale**
 Cymbeline*

References

Bibliography